Aleksei Aleksandrovich Korbut (born 27 June 1981) is a former Russian professional football player.

Club career
He played 5 seasons in the Russian Football National League for 4 different clubs.

References

External links
 

1981 births
Sportspeople from Stavropol
Living people
Russian footballers
Association football defenders
FC Dynamo Stavropol players
FC Yenisey Krasnoyarsk players
FC Volga Nizhny Novgorod players
FC Novokuznetsk players
FC Volgar Astrakhan players
FC Oryol players
FC Sakhalin Yuzhno-Sakhalinsk players
FC Mashuk-KMV Pyatigorsk players